D422 is a state road branching off from D424 expressway connecting it to Zadar Airport. The road is 3.9 km long.

The road, as well as all other state roads in Croatia, is managed and maintained by Hrvatske ceste, state owned company.

Road junctions

See also
 Zadar Airport

Sources

State roads in Croatia
Transport in Zadar County